Edgar Frederick Marie Justin, Baron Michiels van Verduynen (2 December 1885 – 13 May 1952) was a Dutch politician.

Michiels van Verduynen was born in The Hague. He was a wealthy businessman, distinguished diplomat and conservative Catholic. He was a special envoy of the Dutch government to Czechoslovakia between 1920 and 1923. He became ambassador in London in 1939, shortly after the outbreak of the Second World War. When the Dutch government went into exile in London, he joined as a minister without portfolio.

He married in The Hague on 24 November 1917 with Henriette Elisabeth Jochems (1882–1968). The marriage was childless and he died in London in 1952.

Decorations
 Knight in the Order of the Netherlands Lion, 1922
 Commander in the Order of the Netherlands Lion, 1946
 Knight Grand Cross in the Order of the Netherlands Lion, 1949
 Grand Cross of the Order of the White Lion (Czechoslovakia), 1924

References 
  Parlement.com

1885 births
1952 deaths
Ambassadors of the Netherlands to the United Kingdom
Commanders of the Order of the Netherlands Lion
20th-century Dutch businesspeople
Dutch nobility
Dutch Roman Catholics
Knights of the Order of the Netherlands Lion
Leiden University alumni
Ministers without portfolio of the Netherlands
Diplomats from The Hague
Grand Crosses of the Order of the White Lion
Businesspeople from The Hague